Eemi Tervaportti  (born 26 July 1989) is a Finnish professional volleyball player. He is a member of the Finland national team. At the professional club level, he plays for Jastrzębski Węgiel.

Honours

Clubs
 National championships
 2009/2010  Finnish Cup, with Sun Volley Oulu
 2009/2010  Finnish Championship, with Sun Volley Oulu
 2012/2013  Belgian Cup, with Knack Roeselare
 2012/2013  Belgian Championship, with Knack Roeselare
 2013/2014  Belgian SuperCup, with Knack Roeselare
 2013/2014  Belgian Championship, with Knack Roeselare
 2014/2015  Belgian SuperCup, with Knack Roeselare
 2014/2015  Belgian Championship, with Knack Roeselare
 2018/2019  Greek League Cup, with Olympiacos
 2018/2019  Greek Championship, with Olympiacos
 2020/2021  Polish Championship, with Jastrzębski Węgiel
 2021/2022  Polish SuperCup, with Jastrzębski Węgiel
 2022/2023  Polish SuperCup, with Jastrzębski Węgiel

References

External links

 
 Player profile at PlusLiga.pl  
 Player profile at Volleybox.net

1989 births
Living people
Sportspeople from Pirkanmaa
Finnish men's volleyball players
Finnish expatriate sportspeople in France
Expatriate volleyball players in France
Finnish expatriate sportspeople in Belgium
Expatriate volleyball players in Belgium
Finnish expatriate sportspeople in Turkey
Expatriate volleyball players in Turkey
Finnish expatriate sportspeople in Poland
Expatriate volleyball players in Poland
Finnish expatriate sportspeople in Greece
Expatriate volleyball players in Greece
Olympiacos S.C. players
Jastrzębski Węgiel players
Setters (volleyball)